Zubaidah bint Ja`far ibn al-Mansur (died 26 Jumada I 216 AH / 10 July 831 CE) was the best known of the Abbasid princesses, and the wife and double cousin of Harun al-Rashid. She is particularly remembered for the series of wells, reservoirs and artificial pools that provided water for Muslim pilgrims along the route from Baghdad to Mecca and Medina, which was renamed the Darb Zubaidah in her honor. The exploits of her and her husband, Harun al-Rashid, form part of the basis for The Thousand and One Nights.

Biography
Zubaidah's birthdate is unknown; it is known that she was at least a year younger than Harun. Her father, Ja'far was a half-brother of the Abbasid caliph al-Mahdi. Her mother, Salsal, was an elder sister of al-Khayzuran, second and most powerful wife of al-Mahdi, and mother of the future caliphs Musa al-Hadi and Harun al-Rashid.

Zubaidah is a pet name, given by her grandfather, caliph al-Mansur. The name means "little butter ball". Zubaidah's real name at birth was Sukhainah or Amat al-'Aziz". Later, Zubaidah got a kunya, Umm Ja'far (meaning Mother of Ja'far), which reflects her royal lineage as a granddaughter of caliph Abu Ja'far al-Mansur and a wife of caliph Abu Ja'far Harun al-Rashid.

She was the granddaughter of the Abbasid caliph Al-Mansur, through his son Ja'far, and cousin of al-Rashid (763 or 766–809), who she later married (Dhu al-Hijjah 165 AH/July 782 CE). The Abbasid caliph Muhammad al-Amin, who had a double royal lineage, was Zubaidah's son. Her stepson was 'Abdullah al-Ma'mun, who also became a caliph after the civil war with al-Amin.

It is said that Zubaidah's palace 'sounded like a beehive' because she employed one hundred women maids who had memorized the Qur'an.

On her fifth pilgrimage to Mecca she saw that a drought had devastated the population and reduced the Zamzam Well to a trickle of water. She ordered the well to be deepened and spent over 2 million dinars improving the water supply of Makkah and the surrounding province. "This included the construction of an aqueduct from the spring of Hunayn, 95 kilometers to the east, as well as the famed "Spring of Zubayda" on the plain of Arafat, one of the ritual locations on the Hajj. When her engineers cautioned her about the expense, never mind the technical difficulties, she replied that she was determined to carry out the work "were every stroke of a pickax to cost a dinar", according to Ibn Khallikan. "

She also improved the pilgrim route across nine hundred miles of desert between Kufa and Mecca. The road was paved and cleared of boulders and she assembled water storages at intervals. The water tanks also caught the surplus rainwater from storms that occasionally drowned people.

Ibn Battuta, referring to Zubaidah, states that "every reservoir, pool or well on this road which goes from Mecca to Baghdad is due to her munificient bounty...had it not been for her concern on behalf of this road, it would not be usable by anyone." He specifically mentions the water reservoirs at Birkat al-Marjum and al-Qarurah.

Zubaidah hired a staff of assistants to manage her properties and to act on her behalf in numerous business ventures, independent of Harun. Her private home was also administered in a luxurious manner. Her meals were presented on gold and silver plates instead of the simple leather tray commonly used at the time, and she introduced the fashion trend of wearing sandals stitched with gems. She was also carried on a palanquin made of silver, ebony, and lined with silk.

She built herself a palace with a large carpeted banquet hall supported by pillars made of ivory and gold. Verses of the Koran were engraved on the walls in gold letters. The palace was encircled by a garden full of uncommon animals and birds. She had a pet monkey attired as a cavalry soldier and hired 30 servants to attend to the monkey's needs. Zubaidah's visitors, including high-ranking generals, were required to kiss the monkey's hand. In addition, a slew of slave girls followed her everywhere she went and each knew the Koran by heart.

She rebuilt Tabriz after a disastrous earthquake in 791.

Marriage
She was the first wife Harun. Harun and Zubaidah married in 781–82, at the residence of Muhammad bin Sulayman in Baghdad. She had one son, Caliph Muhammad al-Amin. Muhammad, the future al-Amin, was born in April 787 to the Abbasid caliph Harun al-Rashid and Zubaidah.

Death
Zubaidah died in 831, during the reign of her stepson al-Ma'mun.

Caliphs related to her
The Caliphs who were related to her are:

See also
 Lubabah bint Ja'far
 Lubana bint Ali ibn al-Mahdi

References

Sources
 
 
 
 

831 deaths
8th-century women from the Abbasid Caliphate
9th-century women from the Abbasid Caliphate
One Thousand and One Nights characters
Harun al-Rashid
Wives of Abbasid caliphs
Year of birth unknown
8th-century Arabs
Mothers of Abbasid caliphs